Hypnoonops is a genus of spiders in the family Oonopidae. It was first described in 1977 by Benoit. , it contains only one species, Hypnoonops lejeunei found in Congo.

References

Oonopidae
Monotypic Araneomorphae genera
Spiders of Africa